Alberta Provincial Highway No. 2, commonly referred to as Highway 2 or the Queen Elizabeth II Highway, is a major highway in Alberta that stretches from the Canada–United States border through Calgary and Edmonton to Grande Prairie. The Fort Macleod—Edmonton section forms a portion of the CANAMEX Corridor that links Alaska to Mexico. More than half of Alberta's 4 million residents live in the Calgary–Edmonton Corridor created by Highway 2.

U.S. Route 89 enters Alberta from Montana and becomes Highway 2, a two-lane road that traverses the foothills of southern Alberta to Fort Macleod where it intersects Highway 3 and becomes divided.  In Calgary, the route is a busy freeway named Deerfoot Trail that continues into central Alberta as the Queen Elizabeth II Highway, bypassing Red Deer.  In Edmonton, it is briefly concurrent with freeway sections of Highways 216 and 16 before bisecting St. Albert and reverting to two lanes en route to Athabasca.  It bends northwest along the south shore of Lesser Slave Lake as the Northern Woods and Water Route into High Prairie, before turning north to Peace River, west to Fairview and finally south to Grande Prairie where it ends at Highway 43.

Originally numbered as Highway 1, Highway 2 is the oldest major highway in Alberta and the first to stretch north into the Peace Country. It was historically known as the Calgary and Edmonton Trail, Sunshine Trail, and the Blue Trail. Major changes include the construction of a divided expressway between Calgary and Edmonton in the 1960s, realignment along Deerfoot Trail in the 1980s, and twinning south of Nanton in the 1990s. Several projects including median widening and interchange upgrades have been undertaken in the 2010s to increase the safety of the highway's busier sections, with further improvements either under construction or awaiting funding. Bypasses of Fort Macleod, Claresholm, and Nanton are planned as part of Alberta's effort to make its portion of the CANAMEX Corridor free-flowing from border to border.

Route description

Overview
Highway 2 is a core route in the National Highway System of Canada. During the winter, accidents are common on the stretch of the highway between Calgary and Edmonton as the weather can change rapidly and drivers underestimate the conditions, overwhelming emergency services attempting to respond. As the main north–south access in Alberta, Highway 2 is the preferred path of the CANAMEX Corridor. Between Fort Macleod and Edmonton, Highway 2 maintains no fewer than four lanes of traffic and is largely a freeway between Okotoks and Edmonton, with improvements underway to eliminate the at-grade crossings that remain.

Southern Alberta

Foothills
Highway 2 begins at the United States border, as the two lane U.S. Route 89 crosses into Canada at Carway. The road proceeds north through the Rocky Mountain Foothills to a brief concurrency with Highway 501, before bisecting the town of Cardston. At the north end of town, the highway enters Blood Indian Reserve No. 148 and Highway 5 splits west to Waterton Lakes National Park; it is briefly concurrent with Highway 2 before splitting east to cross the St. Mary River en route to Magrath and Lethbridge. Highway 2 continues north to another short concurrency with Highway 505 during which it crosses the Waterton River to Stand Off, continuing across the Belly River to Fort Macleod in the Municipal District of Willow Creek.

Less than 1 km before meeting Highway 3 southeast of Fort Macleod, Highway 2 becomes a divided highway. Highway 3 splits east to Lethbridge, and the combined Highways 2 and 3 turn due west through town as a divided highway at a speed limit of 50 km/h. West of town, the highways diverge at an interchange; Highway 3 continues west as the Crowsnest Highway to Pincher Creek and British Columbia, and Highway 2 turns north across the Oldman River as a divided highway. In tandem with Highway 23, Highway 519 is often used by CANAMEX traffic to bypass Fort Macleod. Further north on Highway 2, the towns of Claresholm and Nanton are each bisected at a reduced speed limit of 50 km/h. The highway is concurrent with Highway 533 for its brief distance through Nanton.

North of Nanton, the highway continues into the Foothills County to a major junction with Highways 23 and 2A at High River, after which it veers northwest to cross the Highwood River. On the other side of the river, a second interchange provides access to Okotoks via Highways 7 and 2A, and Highway 2 continues north across the Sheep River to De Winton where Highway 2A splits into southwest Calgary as Macleod Trail, and Highway 2 veers northeast toward the Bow River valley and southeast Calgary.

Calgary

From its split with Macleod Trail, Highway 2 becomes a major freeway named Deerfoot Trail that descends to cross the Bow River before entering Calgary city limits. In the city it crosses the river twice more, jogging back and forth between its east and west bank. The freeway intersects the Stoney Trail ring road at the south end of Calgary, with signage recommending that traffic en route to Calgary International Airport, Edmonton, and Medicine Hat use eastbound Stoney Trail as a bypass. Deerfoot Trail then merges with the major routes of Anderson Road and Bow Bottom Trail. Crossing Glenmore Trail (Highway 8), Memorial Drive (access to downtown Calgary) and 16 Avenue NE (Highway 1), Deerfoot Trail continues into north Calgary past the Calgary International Airport en route to a second interchange with Stoney Trail at the Calgary city limit. The Deerfoot Trail designation is dropped, and the highway carries on north into Rocky View County.

Central Alberta

Queen Elizabeth II Highway

Highway 2 exits north Calgary as a six-lane freeway called the Queen Elizabeth II Highway, a name it retains until the southern city limit of Edmonton.  It passes the major shopping centre of CrossIron Mills, bisecting the city of Airdrie several kilometers later.  North of Airdrie, the route extends to Highway 72 before bypassing Crossfield and entering Mountain View County, continuing north past interchanges at Highways 581 and 582 leading to the communities of Carstairs and Didsbury, respectively. The highway meets Highway 27 at a cloverleaf interchange near Olds, approximately halfway between Calgary and Red Deer. Highway 2 enters Red Deer County and proceeds to interchanges with Highway 587 at Bowden, Highways 54 and 590 at Innisfail, and Highway 42 near Penhold prior to the city of Red Deer. South of the city, from McKenzie Road to 19 Street, the highway widens to six lanes through an area known as Gasoline Alley.  It is a popular stop for travellers and truckers including fuel stations and food establishments on either side of the highway, accessible via the interchange at McKenzie Road. Continuing north the highway again reduces to four lanes, veering left to bypass Red Deer to the west while Gaetz Avenue splits north into the city.

West of Red Deer, Highway 2 passes Red Deer College and the Alberta Sports Hall of Fame before descending into the valley of the Red Deer River.  It crosses the river alongside a railroad bridge, then curves north to interchanges with Highways 11 and 11A, leading west to Rocky Mountain House and Sylvan Lake, respectively. North of 11A, the highway crosses the Blindman River into Lacombe County to an interchange with Highway 597 at Blackfalds, curving slightly northeast to an interchange at Highway 12 at Lacombe.

North of Lacombe, Highway 2 is again briefly concurrent with Highway 2A before reaching Highway 53 near Ponoka just after crossing the Battle River. The four lane highway continues approximately  through gentle rolling hills of aspen parkland in Ponoka County to an interchange at Highway 611 where it enters Wetaskiwin County. Near Bearhills Lake, the highway meets Highway 13, providing access east to Wetaskiwin and Camrose, and west to Pigeon Lake. North of an interchange with Highway 616 the highway enters Leduc County, bending northeast toward the city of Leduc.

After entering Leduc city limits, Highway 2 meets Highway 2A, which proceeds southeast through Leduc's southern suburbs as a four lane arterial road. Highway 2 immediately travels over Highway 39 at a diamond interchange, serving as the main access to central Leduc and ultimately leading west to Drayton Valley. Traffic levels increase as commuters travel to and from the Leduc area to Edmonton, and the highway meets a second interchange at Highway 19/625 which serves the airport. The highway curves slightly to the northeast to an interchange at 41 Avenue SW, marking the Edmonton city limit and the end of the Queen Elizabeth II Highway designation.

Edmonton and Sturgeon County

Five separately named routes are designated as Highway 2 in the cities of Edmonton and St. Albert, denoted by varying levels of signage. At the south end of Edmonton, the highway significantly widens to five lanes each way. The northbound lanes become Gateway Boulevard and the southbound lanes Calgary Trail, and the two carriageways diverge to pass Gateway Park, located in the median of the highway and accessible from both directions. This diamond interchange is intertwined with the major cloverstack interchange at Anthony Henday Drive (Highway 216) which immediately follows. Henday is a ring road that surrounds Edmonton, connecting Highway 2 to Highway 16. Signage directs traffic destined for Lloydminster to use the southeast portion of Henday to reach Highway 16 north of Sherwood Park. Traffic destined for Jasper, Cold Lake, and Fort McMurray are directed onto the southwest portion of Henday to reach Highway 16 at Edmonton's west end.

The freeway ends as three lanes of Gateway Boulevard eventually widen to four, travelling north past South Edmonton Common through south Edmonton as a busy urban street to Whitemud Drive.

Whitemud Drive descends to cross Whitemud Creek before curving north to span the North Saskatchewan River on the Quesnell Bridge. It then turns back west to meet Anthony Henday Drive again, now in the vicinity of West Edmonton Mall. Henday assumes the designation of Highway 2 for a  stretch to Yellowhead Trail (Highway 16), though the concurrency is unsigned. Yellowhead Trail continues east into Edmonton as a six lane freeway, again unsigned as Highway 2, until St. Albert Trail which proceeds northwest through light industrial and commercial areas before crossing Anthony Henday Drive to exit Edmonton into St. Albert. North of the city, the highway intersects Highway 37 before an interchange at Highway 642 west of Morinville, the main access for the town.

Northern Alberta

Westlock County and Athabasca

Highway 2 reduces to a two lane highway immediately after Morinville, extending north past Manawan and Haley Lakes into Westlock County and a three-way intersection with Highway 18 near Clyde and Westlock. The highway turns due east, briefly concurrent with Highway 18 for 1 km, before turning northeast through increasingly wooded areas and a short concurrency with Highway 663 to Athabasca. The highway descends through the town at 50 km/h as 50 Street toward the Athabasca River valley, before turning west to parallel the river as 50 Avenue.

The speed limit returns to 100 km/h as the highway climbs from the valley toward Baptiste Lake. At the lake, the two lane Highway 2 turns north to follow the west bank of the Athabasca River for approximately  before turning west at Lawrence Lake toward the unincorporated community of Hondo. There, it meets the northern terminus of Highway 44 before crossing the river and continuing northwest for 50 km to the southern terminus of Highway 88 in Slave Lake. Highway 88 follows the east bank of Lesser Slave Lake before a long journey north to Fort Vermilion.  In Slave Lake, Highway 2 bisects the town at a limit of 60 km/h, before returning to 100 km/h west of Caribou Trail, following the scenic southern shore of Lesser Slave Lake to Highway 33  near Kinuso, which leads south to Swan Hills.  At Driftpile the highway crosses a river of the same name en route to High Prairie at the west end of Lesser Slave Lake.

Peace Country
 west of High Prairie, the highway turns north past Winagami Lake to the town of McLennan on the south shore of Kimiwan Lake. It carries on west to a junction with Highway 49, locally known as 'Donnelly Corner'. The two lane highway proceeds north through aspen parkland past Lac Magloire to the town of Nampa, after which it crosses the Heart River, a tributary of Peace River. The highway then curves to the northwest and descends along the steep east bank of the Heart River into the town of Peace River. A passing lane aids eastbound traffic climbing from the valley.

The two lane highway continues west through the town of Peace River before crossing the river of the same name. Climbing on the west bank of the river, it widens to four lanes and meets Alberta Highway 684 (Shaftesbury Trail) before exiting Peace River, reducing to two lanes, and passing north of Peace River Airport.  east Cardinal Lake, Highway 2 meets Highway 35, the Mackenzie Highway. Highway 2 turns south to Grimshaw, while Highway 35 turns north, following the Peace River to High Level. Highway 2 bisects Grimshaw as 51 Street, then exits the town before turning west shortly thereafter, winding through the aspen parkland of the Peace Country to the town of Fairview, in which a campus of Grande Prairie Regional College is immediately south of the highway. The road continues west out of Fairview as Highway 64A, while Highway 2 turns south to exit the town, curving west then south again toward the Peace River valley. It again curves west to descend along the river's steep north bank. Passing lanes assist traffic climbing from the valley on both sides of the river.

Highway 2 continues south to Highway 59 where it becomes a divided highway before bisecting Sexsmith and continuing to Highway 43 north of Grande Prairie, its northern terminus from 1998 to 2019. Prior to 1998, Highway 2 followed Highway 43 into British Columbia, where it became British Columbia Highway 2 to Dawson Creek.

Traffic

Volume

Highway 2 has a wide range of traffic levels along its length. At the south end, the highway is a lightly travelled two-lane road from the United States border to Fort Macleod. It then doubles to four lanes and volume progressively increases until De Winton north of Okotoks, but remains relatively light. Within Calgary, volume climbs exponentially on Deerfoot Trail through the southern suburbs of the city reaching more than 170,000 vehicles per day at Memorial Drive near downtown, making that stretch of Highway 2 the busiest roadway in western Canada. Volume swiftly drops north of Beddington Trail in Calgary, but remains moderate on the Queen Elizabeth II Highway until Edmonton where it again increases to nearly 100,000 vehicles per day south of the city. Whitemud Drive, Anthony Henday Drive, Yellowhead Trail, and St. Albert Trail are all busy expressways carrying large volumes of local traffic, especially at peak hours. North of St. Albert the drop in traffic is brisk, increasingly so after Morinville where the highway is no longer divided. Volume remains very light through most of the Peace Country before briefly exceeding 20,000 vehicles per day near the northern terminus in Grande Prairie.

Alberta Transportation publishes yearly traffic volume data for provincial highways. The table compares the annual average daily traffic (AADT) at several locations along Highway 2 using data from 2016, expressed as an average daily vehicle count over the span of a year (AADT).

Enforcement and collisions
The Queen Elizabeth II Highway between Calgary and Edmonton is prone to collisions in the winter, sometimes resulting in hours of delay, closures, and redirection of traffic onto sections of the adjacent Highway 2A. Deerfoot Trail in Calgary is also prone to a higher than average number of collisions due to its high volume and concentration of interchanges within a relatively short distance.

Alberta Transportation has established several zones on the Queen Elizabeth II Highway where the 110 km/h speed limit is enforced by aircraft. The program is conducted by the Royal Canadian Mounted Police, and was relaunched in 2013 after being on hiatus due to budget concerns. Several aircraft are used including the Eurocopter AS350 helicopter. The number of tickets written during the operation is generally not enough to negate the cost of operating the aircraft, but police have stated that they are catching drivers committing infractions over a longer stretch of the road. In 2016, Leduc proposed photo radar speed enforcement on Highway 2 between the south end of the city and Edmonton's southern limit to catch excessive speeders, pending provincial approval. It is already in use within Edmonton and Leduc limits, but it would be the first implementation on Highway 2. Some residents complained that revenue was the main objective of the project. Leduc mayor Greg Krischke said that the project is not a "cash cow" and the primary objective is to reduce excessive speed and increase safety for first responders. An Alberta Transportation study shows that 100,000 vehicles exceeded  on the stretch in 2015, and Krischke said that drivers who do not want tickets should abide by the speed limit. However, in 2014, less than 10% of injury collisions in Alberta involved drivers travelling at unsafe speeds. Tailgating was a factor in almost 50% of injury collisions.

History

Early years

Trails in the vicinity of the Calgary–Edmonton Corridor long predate the province of Alberta itself, which was not split from the Northwest Territories until 1905. The Calgary and Edmonton Trail was established as several trails ran south from a fur trade post that had been established at Fort Edmonton prior to 1800. The northern portion of the route between Calgary and Edmonton was traveled by David Thompson in 1800. The more modern trail was blazed by John McDougall in 1873 as far as Morley and extended to Calgary two years later.  Development of the trail allowed mail service between Calgary and Edmonton in July 1883.

By 1930, the entire present-day alignment of Highway 2 through to the British Columbia west of Grande Prairie had already been established as the Sunshine Trail.
 It was a gravelled highway that ran from the US border at Carway directly through Macleod, Calgary, Red Deer and Edmonton to Clyde where it became a dirt road. North of Clyde, it was the only highway that extended north into the Peace Country, bending east to Athabasca then northwest to Peace River. A secondary dirt road proceeded southwest to Dunvegan and the current terminus at Grande Prairie.

When Alberta highways first received numbers, the present-day Highway 2 was originally designated as Highway 1. When the major east—west route through Calgary that had been previously designated as Highway 2 was assigned to the Trans-Canada Highway, the province's major north—south route became Highway 2. A review of historical Alberta official road maps shows this to be the case prior to 1941. Highway 2 is one of the oldest major highways in Alberta, and the first to stretch north into the Peace Country as it long predates Highways 43 and 63.

Later years
The intermittent sections of two-lane road between Calgary and Edmonton now designated as Highway 2A previously comprised the primary route between Calgary and Edmonton, Passing through Carstairs, the heart of Red Deer, Blackfalds, Ponoka, and Wetaskiwin. Plans were developed in the late 1950s for a new four-lane superhighway to connect Calgary and Edmonton, creating a safer route that would bypass most of the communities along the way. The plan to bypass Red Deer and Lacombe was presented by minister Gordon Taylor on September 15, 1960 at a meeting in Red Deer. The new $7 million divided highway would alleviate congestion on the existing route through Red Deer, splitting from the existing route south of the city and veering west to cross the Red Deer and Blindman Rivers before rejoining the old highway north of Lacombe. The routing was somewhat of a surprise to residents, who had expected the new bypass to pass east of the city. The previous route had been carrying 5,000 vehicles per day. The bypass  opened on November 21, 1962. The previous segment of two-lane highway to the east, which had been carrying 5,000 vehicles per day prior to the opening of the expressway, was renamed Highway 2A and now carries commuter traffic over the Blindman River between Blackfalds and Red Deer.

In northern Alberta, 1966 saw work begin on initial grading for Highway 2 in the vicinity of Peace River. The section from Hondo to Slave Lake was completed and opened to traffic on October 18, 1966. The 8-span,  bridge over the Peace River was completed in 1968. An interchange at the highway's DeWinton turnoff south of Calgary was planned for 1974.

On May 23, 2005, the section between Calgary and Edmonton was renamed the Queen Elizabeth II Highway in honour of the Queen's visit to Alberta as part of the province's centennial celebrations; the first road sign was personally unveiled by the Queen. It was the first highway in Canada to be named for her. Twinning south of Calgary continued in the 1990s. Several projects including median widening and interchange upgrades were completed in the 2010s that increased the safety of the highway's busier sections.

In the early morning hours of December 15, 2011, a Lethbridge man killed three people on Highway 2 immediately north of Claresholm. The man turned the gun on himself in a murder–suicide.

Work began in 2016 to straighten the alignment of Highway 2 at the south end of Red Deer. The project included demolition of an existing bridge and construction of four new bridges for Highway 2. A substandard curve was removed and straightened, and a left entrance to Highway 2 for southbound traffic from Gaetz Avenue was reconstructed to crossover to the west side of the highway before joining the southbound lanes from the right side in a more conventional configuration. The existing bridges on this section of the highway had been constructed in 1962. The project was completed in 2018.

Future

Southern Alberta

Highway 2 from Fort Macleod to south Edmonton is part of the CANAMEX Corridor, a divided highway with a combination of interchanges and several at-grade intersections except for a  fully controlled-access freeway section in Calgary. The only set of traffic lights on this CANAMEX section are in central Claresholm; a bypass is proposed that would carry Highway 2 to the east of town on a new free-flowing alignment. A similar bypass to the east of Nanton is also proposed. A bypass of Fort Macleod has also been planned, tentatively designated as Highway 2X. It would be constructed in conjunction with a Highway 3 bypass of the town, making both routes free-flowing through the area. Plans have also been drafted for significant reconstruction of the interchange of Highway 2 and Highway 23 near High River. The existing cloverleaf interchange was built in 1967 and does not meet the current standards in Alberta's Highway Design Guide.

In Calgary, where Highway 2 (Deerfoot Trail) experiences heavy congestion at peak hours, a major planning study is underway to determine the best course of action for upgrades to the freeway. In 2007, a study was completed by Alberta outlining plans for upgrades to the incomplete interchange of Glenmore Trail and Deerfoot Trail, one of the busiest road junctions in the province. Stage 1 of the proposed improvements would correct a pinch point on Deerfoot Trail by constructing a new three lane bridge to carry the northbound lanes over Glenmore. The southbound lanes would then be realigned on the existing bridges, such that Deerfoot Trail would be three lanes each way through the interchange, up from two.

Central and northern Alberta
Planning is underway to convert the Queen Elizabeth II Highway between Calgary and Edmonton to a freeway. Near Red Deer, traffic levels are close to 50,000 vehicles per day, and Alberta Transportation begins consideration of widening to six lanes when levels exceed 30,000 vehicles per day. South of Airdrie, reconstruction of an existing interchange at Highway 566 is proposed, and new interchanges have been planned at Township Roads 264 and 265 to support future development in the area. Widening of the highway from four to six lanes between Airdrie and Crossfield is planned, and between Highway 42 and Highway 597.

Between Edmonton and Leduc, Alberta Transportation has drafted plans to construct a dual freeway system in conjunction with a second ring road approximately  beyond Anthony Henday Drive. The existing interchange at Highway 2A south of Leduc would be closed and reconstructed to modern standards further south. Between Edmonton and 41 Avenue SW, the highway would be realigned several hundred meters to the west to facilitate construction of a large interchange with the outer ring road. The existing bridges at Airport Road, Highway 19, 41 Avenue SW, and Ellerslie Road have all been constructed with sufficient width to allow for construction of two additional sets of lanes. In 2015, a planning study was completed outlining a new interchange at 65 Avenue in Leduc. In northwest Edmonton, a planned extension of Ray Gibbon Drive will bypass St. Albert from Anthony Henday Drive to Highway 2. Upon completion of this road, Ray Gibbon Drive would be designated as Highway 2. On June 1, 2020, work began on the first phase to twin Ray Gibbon Drive from 137 Avenue NW to just north of LeClair Way. An interchange at Cardiff Road is also planned, just south of Morinville.

North of Morinville, Highway 2 is a lightly travelled two lane highway carrying well under 10,000 vehicles per day, but in 2012 Alberta Transportation completed a study to plan for extension of twinning from Morinville to north of Highway 18 near Clyde. In 2013, a study was completed analyzing possible truck bypasses of Athabasca, to the east and west of the current alignment. A 2010 study assessed twinning of Highway 49 from Valleyview to Donnelly, and Highway 2 from Donnelly to south of Nampa.

Major intersections

See also 

Calgary and Edmonton Trail
CANAMEX Corridor
Pan-American Highway
Transportation in Calgary
Transportation in Edmonton

Notes

References

External links 

CANAMEX Trade Corridor by Alberta Transportation.

002
002
Northern Woods and Water Route
Airdrie, Alberta
Athabasca, Alberta
High River
Leduc, Alberta
Roads in Calgary
Roads in Edmonton
Roads in St. Albert, Alberta
Transport in Red Deer, Alberta